Ornithichnites is an ichnotaxon of mammal footprint that was originally classified as a dinosaur. The name was originally used by Edward Hitchcock in 1836 as a higher group name rather than a specific ichnogenus, and thus the name does not have priority over specific ichnogeneric names even if they were first identified as Ornithichnites. Only two ichnospecies exist: O. crassus and O. argenterae.

References

Mammal trace fossils
Jurassic mammals